Lassing is a municipality in the district of Liezen, Styria, Austria.

On July 17, 1998, a local mine collapsed. One man survived but ten others perished.

Population

References

External links 
 Official website
 Holidays in Lassing

Cities and towns in Liezen District